Les Foufounes Électriques is a club and concert venue located at 87 Saint Catherine Street East in the city of Montreal, Quebec, Canada in a neighbourhood known as the Quartier Latin (Latin Quarter). It is a multi-level establishment with two concert spaces and a dance floor. The club opened in 1983 and became a centre for underground music, underground art, and culture in Montreal.

Known as "Foufs" by the locals, the club is the oldest alternative rock venue in the city.

History 

In 1983, Norman Boileau, François Gourd and Bernard Paquet, 3 friends from the same musical theatre group, decided to open a bar which would also serve as a place to showcase burgeoning alternative musicians and different types of art. Some of the more notable early art performances included applying paint to human canvasses as well as the walls of the club itself - these sessions were known as "Peinture en Direct" (live painting). The club's inner decor includes graffiti covered walls and strange sculptures. According to Gourd, the bar did not turn much of a profit and he sold his share in the club after 5 years. By the end of the 80s, Boileau was the only remaining owner.

The name "Les Foufounes Électriques" in Quebec French literally translates to "the electric buttocks". According to a 2008 article which appeared in The Guardian the name originated from "its founders' habits of exhibiting their painted derrieres in old TV sets."

During the 80s the club became a centre for the punk and gothic subcultures of Montreal, however the club has also been home to many varieties of underground and alternative styles of music, including new wave, reggae, ska, industrial, grunge, and hip-hop. The club tends to attract a younger punk/alternative rock crowd in addition to and including students from one of Montreal's many colleges and universities.

Some of the more well known international artists who have performed at the venue include Nirvana, Green Day, Queens of the Stone Age, Mano Negra, The Dickies, William S. Burroughs and Marianne Faithfull. In addition to live musical performances and various DJ shows, the venue has also hosted a variety of non-musical events, including barbecues, art shows and sideshows.

References

External links 
A video clip about the club which originally appeared on the Radio Canada French-language tv series "L'Enfer, c'est nous autres" on June 14, 1993. Last retrieved Jun 17, 2010.
A video clip from Halloween night, in 2000. It really illustrates the creative and fun vibe that is still found in the club to this day.  WARNING - Some of the costumes may not be considered appropriate for young children.  Last retrieved October 12, 2010.

1983 establishments in Quebec
Music venues completed in 1983
Music venues in Montreal
Nightclubs in Montreal
Punk rock venues
Quartier Latin, Montreal
Rock music venues